Income Tax Act may refer to:

United Kingdom
 Income Tax Act 1842
 Income Tax Act 1952
 Income Tax (Trading and Other Income) Act 2005
 Income Tax Act 2007

Elsewhere
 Income Tax Act 1976, a Statute of New Zealand 
 Income Tax Act 1985, an Act governing income taxes in Canada
 The Income-tax Act, 1961, an Act of the Parliament of India
 Individual Income Tax Act of 1944, an Act raising income tax in the United States